Faribault County is a county in the U.S. state of Minnesota. As of the 2020 census, the population was 13,921. Its county seat is Blue Earth.

History
The county was founded in 1855. It was named for Jean-Baptiste Faribault, a settler and French fur trader among the Sioux Indians.

Geography
Faribault County lies on the south side of Minnesota. Its southern border abuts the north border of the state of Iowa. The Blue Earth River flows northerly through the west-central part of the county; it enters from Iowa as two branches, West Branch and Middle Branch, merging at 5 miles (8 km) into the county. It is joined by East Branch near the city of Blue Earth, thence flows northward into Blue Earth County. The Maple River flows west-northwestward through the upper central part of the county, entering from Freeborn County and exiting to Blue Earth County. The Cobb River also flows through the NE part of the county, from Freeborn to Blue Earth county.

The county terrain consists of semi-arid rolling hills, devoted to agriculture. The SE portion is a glacial moraine near Kiester, and is known as the Kiester Moraine.

Lakes

 Bass Lake (Delavan Twp)
 Hart Lake
 Minnesota Lake
 Rice Lake (Delavan Twp)
 Rice Lake (Foster Twp)
 South Walnut Lake
 Walnut Lake

Major highways

  Interstate 90
  U.S. Highway 169
  Minnesota State Highway 22
  Minnesota State Highway 109

Adjacent counties

 Blue Earth County - north
 Waseca County - northeast
 Freeborn County - east
 Winnebago County, Iowa - southeast
 Kossuth County, Iowa - southwest
Martin County - west

Protected areas
 Walnut Lake State Wildlife Management Area

Demographics

2000 census
As of the 2000 census, there were 16,181 people, 6,652 households, and 4,476 families in the county. The population density was 22.7/sqmi (8.77/km2). There were 7,247 housing units at an average density of 10.2/sqmi (3.93/km2). The racial makeup of the county was 97.11% White, 0.24% Black or African American, 0.19% Native American, 0.36% Asian, 0.04% Pacific Islander, 1.36% from other races, and 0.69% from two or more races. 3.50% of the population were Hispanic or Latino of any race. 45.5% were of German, 21.2% Norwegian and 5.1% Irish ancestry.

There were 6,652 households, out of which 28.50% had children under the age of 18 living with them, 57.80% were married couples living together, 6.10% had a female householder with no husband present, and 32.70% were non-families. 29.70% of all households were made up of individuals, and 16.80% had someone living alone who was 65 years of age or older. The average household size was 2.36 and the average family size was 2.93.

The county population contained 24.40% under the age of 18, 6.70% from 18 to 24, 23.20% from 25 to 44, 23.50% from 45 to 64, and 22.20% who were 65 years of age or older. The median age was 42 years. For every 100 females there were 97.20 males. For every 100 females age 18 and over, there were 92.50 males.

The median income for a household in the county was $34,440, and the median income for a family was $41,793. Males had a median income of $28,990 versus $20,224 for females. The per capita income for the county was $17,193. About 5.50% of families and 8.60% of the population were below the poverty line, including 9.40% of those under age 18 and 10.20% of those age 65 or over.

2020 Census

Communities

Cities

 Blue Earth (county seat)
 Bricelyn
 Delavan
 Easton
 Elmore
 Frost
 Kiester
 Minnesota Lake (Partly in Blue Earth County)
 Walters
 Wells
 Winnebago

Unincorporated communities

 Baroda
 Brush Creek
 Clayton (Ghost Town)
 Dell
 Guckeen
 Homedahl (Ghost Town)
 Huntley
 Marna
 Pilot Grove

Townships

 Barber Township
 Blue Earth City Township
 Brush Creek Township
 Clark Township
 Delavan Township
 Dunbar Township
 Elmore Township
 Emerald Township
 Foster Township
 Jo Daviess Township
 Kiester Township
 Lura Township
 Minnesota Lake Township
 Pilot Grove Township
 Prescott Township
 Rome Township
 Seely Township
 Verona Township
 Walnut Lake Township
 Winnebago City Township

Government and politics
Faribault County has primarily supported Republican Party candidates in presidential elections throughout its history. Only six times since 1892 has a Republican candidate failed to win the county in a presidential election, most recently Bob Dole in 1996.

Education
School districts include:
 Alden-Conger Public School District
 Blue Earth Area Public Schools
 Granada-Huntley-East Chain School District
 Janesville-Waldorf-Pemberton School District
 Maple River School District
 United South Central School District

It also has the following state-operated schools:
 Minnesota State Academy for the Blind
 Minnesota State Academy for the Deaf

See also
 National Register of Historic Places listings in Faribault County MN

References

External links
 Faribault County Government's website
 Faribault County info at Rootsweb

 
Minnesota counties
1855 establishments in Minnesota Territory